Åstorp Municipality (Åstorps kommun) is a municipality in Scania County in South Sweden in southern Sweden. Its seat is located in the town of Åstorp.

In 1974 "old" Åstorp (a market town (köping) since 1946) was amalgamated with Kvidinge to form the present municipality.

Localities
There are 3 urban areas (also called a Tätort or locality) in Åstorp Municipality.

In the table they are listed according to the size of the population as of December 31, 2005.

A small part of Åstorp is situated in Ängelholm Municipality.

References
Statistics Sweden

External links

Åstorp Municipality - Official site
Coat of arms

Municipalities of Skåne County